Karan Sharma is an Indian television actor. He has played Karan Modi in show Ekk Nayi Pehchaan on Sony TV . He is currently playing Vivaan Oswal in the Colors TV television show Sasural Simar Ka 2.

Personal life 
Karan was born in Garhwali family from Ranipokhari in Dehradun, Uttarakhand.

He started his acting career from National School of Drama in Delhi acting in English and Kannada plays. He continued his stage career appearing as lead roles in various plays. In 2018, Sharma was due to appear in the mythological show Karn Sangini but was dropped at the last minute.

In December 2019, he divorced his wife Tiaara Kar after three years of relationship.

Television

References

External links
 

Living people
Indian male soap opera actors
Indian male television actors
Year of birth missing (living people)
Place of birth missing (living people)
21st-century Indian male actors